is a former Japanese football player.

Club statistics

References

External links

1985 births
Living people
National Institute of Fitness and Sports in Kanoya alumni
Association football people from Tokyo Metropolis
People from Akishima, Tokyo
Japanese footballers
J2 League players
Tokushima Vortis players
Association football midfielders